The Elizabeth River, New Zealand is a river of Fiordland, New Zealand. It rises north of Mount George and flows westward through Fiordland National Park into the Malaspina Reach of Doubtful Sound at Olphert Cove. Elizabeth Island is in the Reach by the river mouth. The river and island were named by Captain John Grono after his brig Elizabeth in late 1822 or early 1823.

See also
List of rivers of New Zealand

References

Land Information New Zealand - Search for Place Names

Rivers of Fiordland